Outdoor recreation or outdoor activity refers to recreation done outside, most commonly in natural settings. The activities that encompass outdoor recreation vary depending on the physical environment they are being carried out in. These activities can include fishing, hunting, backpacking, and horseback riding — and can be completed individually or collectively. Outdoor recreation is a broad concept that encompasses a varying range of activities and landscapes.

Outdoor recreation is typically pursued for purposes of physical exercise, general wellbeing, and spiritual renewal. While a wide variety of outdoor recreational activities can be classified as sports, they do not all demand that a participant be an athlete. Rather, it is the collectivist idea that is at the fore in outdoor recreation, as outdoor recreation does not necessarily encompass the same degree of competitiveness or rivalry that is embodied in sporting matches or championships. Competition generally is less stressed than in organized individual or team sports.
When the activity involves exceptional excitement, physical challenge, or risk, it is sometimes referred to as "adventure recreation" or "adventure training", rather than an extreme sport.

Other traditional examples of outdoor recreational activities include hiking, camping, mountaineering, cycling, dog walking, canoeing, caving, kayaking, rafting, rock climbing, running, sailing, skiing, sky diving and surfing.  As new pursuits, often hybrids of prior ones, emerge, they gain their own identities, such as coasteering, canyoning, fastpacking, and plogging.
 
In many cities, recreational areas for various outdoor activities are created for the population. These include natural parks, parks, playgrounds, sports facilities but also areas with free sea access such as the beach area of Venice Beach in California, the Promenade des Anglais in Nice or the waterfront of Barcola in Trieste.

Purpose

Outdoor recreation involves any kind of activity within an outdoor environment. Outdoor recreation can include established sports, and individuals can participate without association with teams, competitions or clubs. Activities include backpacking, canoeing, canyoning, caving, climbing, hiking, hill walking, hunting, kayaking, and rafting. Broader groupings include water sports, snow sports, and horseback riding.

People engage in physical activity outdoors as a form of recreation. Various physical activities can be completed individually or communally. Sports which are mainly played indoors or other settings such as fields are able to transition to an outdoor setting for recreational and non-competitive purposes.  Outdoor physical activities can help people learn new skills, test stamina and endurance, and participate in social activities. 

Outdoor activities are also frequently used as a setting for education and team building.

List of activities

 Abseiling
 Adventure park
 Airsoft
 All-terrain vehicle riding
 Amusement park
 Angling
 Aviation
 Backpacking
 BASE jumping
 Benchmarking (geolocating)
 Birdwatching
 Bungee jumping
 Camping
 Canoeing
 Canyoning
 Caving
 Clam digging
 Coasteering
 Cold-weather biking
 Corn maze
 Cross-country skiing
 Cycling
 Disc golf
 Dog park
 Driving
 Fitness trail
 Fly fishing
 Gardening
 Geocaching
 Gliding
 Grilling
 Hang gliding
 Hiking
 Horseback riding
 Hot air ballooning
 Hunting
 Ice climbing
 Ice fishing
 Ice skating
 Jetskiing
 Kayaking
 Letterboxing
 Metal detecting
 Mountain biking
 Mountain climbing
 Mountaineering
 Mushroom hunting
 Nordic walking
 Off-roading
 Orienteering
 Outdoor fitness
 Outdoor gym
 Paintball
 Paragliding
 Parasailing
 Outdoor party
 Photography
 Picnic
 Plogging
 Paramotoring
 Rafting
 Rappelling
 Rock climbing
 Running
 Safari park
 Safari
 Sandboarding
 Scuba diving
 Seatrekking
 Sightseeing
 Skateboarding
 Skiing
 Sport fishing
 Skydiving
 Skyrunning
 Sledding
 Snorkeling
 Snowboarding
 Snowmobiling
 Snowshoeing
 Standup paddleboarding
 Sunbathing
 Surfing
 Swimming
 Tombstoning
 Tourism
 Tree climbing
 Trekking
 Urban exploration
 Water sports
 Waterskiing
 Windsurfing
 Wingsuit flying
 Winter swimming
 Zip line

Examples

Trekking

Trekking can be understood as an extended walk and involves day hikes, overnight or extended hikes. An example of a day trek is hiking during the day and returning at night to a lodge for a hot meal and a comfortable bed.  Physical preparation for trekking includes cycling, swimming, jogging and long walks. Trekking requires experience with basic survival skills, first aid, and orienteering when going for extended hikes or staying out overnight.

Mountain biking
The activity of mountain biking involves steering a mountain cycle over rocky tracks and around boulder-strewn paths. Mountain bikes or ATBs (all-terrain bikes) feature a rugged frame and fork. Their frames are often built of aluminum so they are lightweight and stiff, making them efficient to ride.

Many styles of mountain biking are practiced, including all mountain, downhill, trials, dirt jumping, trail riding, and cross country. The latter two are the most common.

Balance, core strength, and endurance are all physical traits that are required to go mountain biking. Riders also need bike handling skills and the ability to make basic repairs to their bikes. More advanced mountain biking involves technical descents such as down hilling and free riding.

Canyoning

Canyoning is an activity which involves climbing, descending, jumping and trekking through canyons. The sport originates from caving and involves both caving and climbing techniques. Canyoning often includes descents that involve rope work, down-climbing, or jumps that are technical in nature. Canyoning is frequently done in remote and rugged settings and often requires navigational, route-finding and other wilderness skills.

Education

Outdoor education in the United States 
Education is also a popular focus of outdoor activity. University outdoor recreation programs are becoming more popular in the United States. Studies have show that outdoor recreation programs can be beneficial to a students well-being and stress levels in terms of calming and soothing the mind. Universities in the United States often offer indoor rock climbing walls, equipment rental, ropes courses and trip programming. A few universities give degrees in adventure recreation, which aims to teach graduates how to run businesses in the field of adventure recreation.

Outdoor education in the United Kingdom 
In the UK, the house of commons' Education and Skills Committee supports outdoor education. The committee encourages fieldwork projects since it helps in the development of ‘soft’ skills and social skills, particularly in hard to reach children. These activities can also take place on school trips, on visits in the local community or even on the school grounds.

Outdoor enthusiast 

Outdoor enthusiast and outdoorsy are terms for a person who enjoys outdoor recreation. The terms outdoorsman, sportsman, woodsman, or bushman have also been used to describe someone with an affinity for the outdoors.

Some famous outdoor enthusiasts include U.S. president Teddy Roosevelt, Robert Baden-Powell, Ernest Hemingway, Ray Mears, Bear Grylls, Doug Peacock, Richard Wiese, Kenneth "Speedy" Raulerson, Earl Shaffer, Jo Gjende, Saxton Pope, Randy Stoltmann, Christopher Camuto, Eva Shockey, Jim Shockey, Henry Pittock, Eddie Bauer, Gaylord DuBois, Euell Gibbons, Clay Perry, Arthur Hasketh Groom, Bill Jordan, and Corey Ford. Some pioneering female outdoor enthusiasts include Mary Seacole, Isabella Bird, Emma Rowena Gatewood, Claire Marie Hodges, Mina Benson Hubbard, Beryl Markham, Freya Stark, Margaret Murie, Celia Hunter, Rachel Carson, Terry Tempest Williams, Marjory Stoneman Douglas, Ruth Dyar Mendenhall, and Arlene Blum.

Sparsely populated areas with mountains, lakes, rivers, scenic views, and rugged terrain are popular with outdoor enthusiasts. In the United States, state parks and national parks offer campgrounds and opportunities for recreation of the sort. In the UK, all of rural Scotland and all those areas of England and Wales designated as "right to roam" areas are available for outdoor enthusiasts on foot. Some areas are also open to mountain bikers and to horse riders.

Outdoor recreation and cuisine 
Culinary techniques and foods popular with outdoor enthusiasts include dutch ovens, grilling, cooking over "open fires" (often with rock fire rings), fish fries, granola, and trail mix (sometimes referred to as GORP for "good old raisins and peanuts").

International and National Outdoor Recreation Days
Nationally and internationally, a number of days have been designated for the outdoors.

 Canadian Rivers Day
 National Cleanup Day
 National Public Lands Day
 National Trails Day
 World Oceans Day
 Global Running Day

Synonyms

BBC uses the word «free-luftz-leev» as a synonym for outdoor recreation in Scandinavia.

See also
 Adventure travel
 Hazards of outdoor recreation
 Health effects of sunlight exposure

Notes

References